Computers in Human Behavior is a monthly peer-reviewed academic journal covering human-computer interaction and cyberpsychology. It was established in 1985 and is published by Elsevier. The editor-in-chief is Matthieu Guitton (Laval University). In 2020, the journal launched a companion gold open access peer-reviewed title, Computers in Human Behavior Reports.

Abstracting and indexing

According to the Journal Citation Reports, the journal has a 2020 impact factor of 6.829.

References

External links

Elsevier academic journals
Human–computer interaction journals
Publications established in 1985
Bimonthly journals
English-language journals